Consonni is an Italian surname. Notable people with the surname include:

Chiara Consonni (born 1999), Italian racing cyclist
Edoardo Consonni, the chief journalist of Ecclesia Dei
Luigi Consonni (born 1977), Italian footballer
Luigi Consonni (cyclist) (1905–1992), Italian cyclist
Pierluigi Consonni (1949–2020), Italian professional footballer
Simone Consonni (born 1994), Italian cyclist

Italian-language surnames